Protea petiolaris, also known as the sickle-leaf sugarbush, is a tree in the Proteaceae family, found in Angola, Democratic Republic of the Congo, Zambia and Zimbabwe.

Description 
Its perfect monoecious flowers open from November through March, and set mature fruit nine to twelve months after flowering. Flowers are pollinated by birds, and the seeds are dispersed by wind.

Habitat 
It prefers woods and grasslands at high altitudes.

References 

petiolaris
Flora of Africa